A second-order propositional logic is a propositional logic extended with quantification over propositions.  A special case are the logics that allow second-order Boolean propositions, where quantifiers may range either just over the Boolean truth values, or over the Boolean-valued truth functions.

The most widely known formalism is the intuitionistic logic with impredicative quantification, System F.  showed how this calculus can be extended to admit classical logic.

See also
Boolean satisfiability problem
Second-order arithmetic
Second-order logic
Type theory

References
 

Propositional calculus